Sara Perry may refer to:

Sara Perry (archaeologist)
Sara Perry, author of Everything Tastes Better with Bacon